is the railway station in Tabira-chō Yamanouchi-men, Hirado, Nagasaki Prefecture. It is operated by Matsuura Railway and is on the Nishi-Kyūshū Line.

This station is the westernmost non-monorail railway station in Japan.

Lines 
Matsuura Railway
Nishi-Kyūshū Line

Adjacent stations

Station layout
The station is ground level with 2 platforms and 3 tracks.

Surrounding area
National Route 204
Hirado City Office Tabira Branch
Hirado Bridge 
Tabira post office
Shinwa Bank Tabira Branch

History
August 6, 1935 - Opens for business as Hiradoguchi Station.
April 1, 1987 - Railways privatize and this station is inherited by JR Kyushu.
April 1, 1988 - This station is inherited by Matsuura Railway.
March 11, 1989 - This Station is renamed Tabira-Hiradoguchi Station.

External links
Matsuura Railway (Japanese)
The introduction of Tabira-Hiradoguchi Station (Nagasaki Shimbun-sha, Japanese)

Railway stations in Japan opened in 1935
Railway stations in Nagasaki Prefecture